Ruhollah Bigdeli (born 21 March 1984) is an Iranian football striker of Mes Sarcheshmeh.

Club career

Club career statistics

 Assist Goals

External links

1984 births
Living people
Iranian footballers
Persian Gulf Pro League players
Esteghlal Ahvaz players
Sanat Mes Kerman F.C. players
Foolad FC players
Association football forwards
Siah Jamegan players
Mes Sarcheshme players